This article lists political parties in Minnesota.

Brief history and overview
Minnesota has had a history of favoring the Minnesota Democratic–Farmer–Labor Party (DFL) candidates since the 1960s, especially in presidential elections where it has been seen as a "safe state" for the Democratic Party candidate. However, Minnesota has also had an active Republican Party that has been viewed as gaining more support since the late 1990s and early 2000s due to population migration to the suburbs along with the party's focus on socially conservative positions on gun control, abortion and gay rights, although those gains have largely been reversed in recent years. The DFL won a majority in the Minnesota House of Representatives for the first time since 1996 in the 2006 elections, defeating the Republican majority. Republicans won a majority in both houses of the Minnesota Legislature in the 2010 elections for the first time since 1973 when party designation for state legislators was reinstated, but lost both majorities to the DFL in the 2012 elections. The governorship is held by DFLer Tim Walz.

Minnesota has one of the strongest levels of support among the states for independent and third-party candidates.

Third political parties
The Minnesota Farmer–Labor Party was a populist political party that managed to elect some of its candidates to the United States Congress, a rare feat among American third political parties, and eventually merged with the Minnesota Democratic Party in 1944 to create the Minnesota Democratic–Farmer–Labor Party. The success of the Minnesota Farmer–Labor Party shielded Minnesota from the worst of the restrictive ballot access laws that were passed in most states during the Red Scare era of the 1920s to 1950s. State law governing nominating petitions for third-party candidates and the definition of a major and minor political party have not prevented the rise of more than two major political parties, and have ensured that several different candidates are on the ballot in most state and federal elections.

In 1998, the Reform Party of Minnesota candidate for governor, Jesse Ventura, won the election. The Reform Party later became the Independence Party of Minnesota. In 2002, Sheila Kiscaden, who had previously been a Republican, was re-elected as a member of the Independence Party. The Green Party of Minnesota has had electoral success in city elections, particularly Minneapolis and Saint Paul.

Recognition
Qualifying as a recognized major or minor political party is determined by how many candidates a party nominates for certain partisan offices, how well candidates for statewide office do in certain partisan elections, or a petition that has the required number of signatures. Generally, a party that presents a statewide candidate that receives at least five percent of the vote or presents a petition to the secretary of state containing a number of signatures equal to at least five percent of the number of individuals who voted in the preceding general election qualifies as a recognized major party. Similarly, the threshold is one percent to qualify as a recognized minor party.

Parties recognized as a major or minor party are eligible to receive funds from the state elections campaign account. Recognized major parties also have automatic ballot access.

Political parties

Recognized major political parties

Recognized minor parties

Unrecognized minor parties
 Constitution Party of Minnesota
 Ecology Democracy Party
 Veterans Party of Minnesota

Historical political parties
 Minnesota Farmer–Labor Party, merged with the Minnesota Democratic Party in 1944 to form the Minnesota Democratic–Farmer–Labor Party.
 Minnesota Progressive Party

See also
 Political party strength in Minnesota

References

Minnesota
List
Political parties